Nuremberg is a census-designated place (CDP) in Schuylkill and Luzerne counties, Pennsylvania, United States. The population was 434 at the 2010 census.

A post office has been in operation in Nuremberg since 1886. The community is served by Hazleton Area School District.

Geography

Nuremberg is located at  (40.938375, -76.169506). The small farming community of Nuremberg is partially located in Black Creek Township (Luzerne County), as well as North Union Township (Schuylkill County).

Demographics

At the 2000 census there were 231 people, 103 households, and 57 families living in the CDP. The population density was 2,207.4 people per square mile (891.9/km2). There were 108 housing units at an average density of 1,032.0/sq mi (417.0/km2).  The racial makeup of the CDP was 98.27% White, and 1.73% Asian.
There were 103 households, 23.3% had children under the age of 18 living with them, 41.7% were married couples living together, 12.6% had a female householder with no husband present, and 43.7% were non-families. 36.9% of households were made up of individuals, and 23.3% were one person aged 65 or older. The average household size was 2.24 and the average family size was 3.02.

The age distribution was 21.6% under the age of 18, 8.7% from 18 to 24, 26.8% from 25 to 44, 27.3% from 45 to 64, and 15.6% 65 or older. The median age was 40 years. For every 100 females, there were 94.1 males. For every 100 females age 18 and over, there were 82.8 males.

The median income for a household in the CDP was $30,000, and the median family income  was $42,500. Males had a median income of $28,333 versus $23,036 for females. The per capita income for the CDP was $15,642. About 16.0% of families and 20.7% of the population were below the poverty line, including 51.0% of those under the age of eighteen and none of those sixty five or over.

References

Census-designated places in Schuylkill County, Pennsylvania
Census-designated places in Luzerne County, Pennsylvania
Census-designated places in Pennsylvania